These 139 species belong to Heriades, a genus of leafcutter, mason, and resin bees in the family Megachilidae.

Heriades species

 Heriades abessinicus Friese, 1915 i c g
 Heriades albiscopanus Strand, 1912 i c g
 Heriades aldabranus Cockerell, 1912 i c g
 Heriades alfkeni Benoist, 1938 i c g
 Heriades ambiguus Cockerell, 1946 i c g
 Heriades ammodendri Popov, 1960 i c g
 Heriades angusticeps Cockerell, 1937 i c g
 Heriades angustulus Cockerell, 1937 i c g
 Heriades apriculus Griswold, 1998 i c g
 Heriades arcuatellus Cockerell, 1937 i c g
 Heriades arnoldi Friese, 1922 i c g
 Heriades bequaerti Cockerell, 1931 i c g
 Heriades bequerti Cockerell, 1931 g
 Heriades binodosus Cockerell, 1936 i c g
 Heriades bouyssoui Vachal, 1903 i c g
 Heriades brage Strand, 1912 i c g
 Heriades bruneri Titus, 1904 i c g
 Heriades burgeoni Benoist, 1931 i c g
 Heriades canalicaulata Benoist, 1931 g
 Heriades canaliculatus Benoist, 1931 i c g
 Heriades cancavus Wu, 1982 i c g
 Heriades capicola Strand, 1912 i c g
 Heriades carinata Cresson, 1864 i b
 Heriades carinatus Cresson, 1864 c g
 Heriades chariensis Benoist, 1931 i c g
 Heriades chrysogaster (Cameron, 1897) i c g
 Heriades chubbi Cockerell, 1916 i c g
 Heriades cingulata Benoist, 1931 i
 Heriades cingulatus Benoist, 1931 c g
 Heriades civicus Cockerell, 1937 i c g
 Heriades clavicornis Morawitz, 1875 i c g
 Heriades crenulatus Nylander, 1856 i c g
 Heriades cressoni Michener, 1938 i c g
 Heriades crucifer Cockerell, 1897 i c g
 Heriades currani Michener, 1943 i c g
 Heriades curviventris Strand, 1912 i c g
 Heriades dalmaticus Maidl, 1922 i c g
 Heriades debilicornis Cockerell, 1940 i c g
 Heriades diminutus Cockerell, 1937 i c g
 Heriades discrepans Benoist, 1938 i c g
 Heriades edentatus Friese, 1922 g
 Heriades ellenbergeri Benoist, 1931 i c g
 Heriades erythrosoma Friese, 1922 i c g
 Heriades eximius Friese, 1904 i c g
 Heriades fertoni Benoist, 1938 i c g
 Heriades filicornis Friese, 1915 i c g
 Heriades flocciferus Brauns, 1929 i c g
 Heriades freygessneri Schletterer, 1889 i c g
 Heriades frontosus Schletterer, 1889 i c g
 Heriades fuelleborni Friese, 1922 i c g
 Heriades fujiyamai Yasumatsu & Hirashima, 1952 i c g
 Heriades fulleborni Friese, 1922 i c g
 Heriades fulvescens Cockerell, 1920 i c g
 Heriades fulvohispidus Yasumatsu & Hirashima, 1952 i c g
 Heriades gibbosus (Friese, 1909) i c g
 Heriades glomerans Schletterer, 1889 c g
 Heriades glutinosus Giraud, 1871 g
 Heriades gracilior Cockerell, 1897 i c g
 Heriades hercules Strand, 1911 i c g
 Heriades hierosolomitus Benoist, 1935 i c g
 Heriades hissaricus Popov, 1955 i c g
 Heriades impressus Schletterer, 1889 i c g
 Heriades ingogoensis Cockerell, 1946 i c g
 Heriades labiatus Pérez, 1896 i c g
 Heriades langenburgicus Strand, 1911 i c g
 Heriades laosellus Cockerell, 1929 i c g
 Heriades latipes Popov, 1960 i c g
 Heriades leavitti Crawford, 1913 i c g b
 Heriades libericus Cockerell, 1931 i c g
 Heriades longicornis (Friese, 1915) i c g
 Heriades longispinis Cockerell, 1944 i c g
 Heriades macrognatus Vachal, 1909 i c g
 Heriades mamilliferus Brauns, 1929 i c g
 Heriades mandibularis Friese, 1922 i c g
 Heriades micheneri Timberlake, 1947 i c g
 Heriades micropthalma Michener, 1954 i c g
 Heriades microstictus Cockerell, 1936 i c g
 Heriades mundulus Cockerell, 1920 i c g
 Heriades nasiferus Cockerell, 1946 i c g
 Heriades nitescens Cockerell, 1931 i c g
 Heriades nodulosus Cockerell, 1937 i c g
 Heriades occidentalis Michener, 1938 i c g
 Heriades orientalis Gupta, 1987 i c g
 Heriades ornaticornis Cockerell, 1936 i c g
 Heriades otavica Eardley & R. P. Urban, 2006 i
 Heriades otavicus Eardley & R. P. Urban, 2006 c g
 Heriades othonis Friese, 1914 i c g
 Heriades pachyacanthus Cockerell, 1940 i c g
 Heriades paganensis Yasumatsu, 1942 i c g
 Heriades parvulus Bingham, 1897 i c g
 Heriades patellus (Nurse, 1902) i c g
 Heriades perminutus Cockerell, 1935 i c g
 Heriades perpolitus Cockerell, 1946 i c g
 Heriades phthisica Gerstäcker, 1858 i
 Heriades phthisicus Gerstäcker, 1857 c g
 Heriades plumosus Krombein, 1950 i c g
 Heriades pogonura Benoist, 1931 i c g
 Heriades pretorii Cockerell, 1946 i c g
 Heriades prionsa (Cameron, 1905) i c g
 Heriades psiadiae Pauly & Griswold, 2001 i c g
 Heriades punctulatus Cockerell, 1917 i c g
 Heriades punctulifer Schletterer, 1889 c g
 Heriades punctulifera Schletterer, 1889 i
 Heriades rowlandi (Cockerell, 1947) i c g
 Heriades rubicolus Pérez, 1890 i c g
 Heriades rufifrons Cockerell, 1932 i c g
 Heriades sakishimanus Yasumatsu & Hirashima, 1965 i c g
 Heriades sauteri Cockerell, 1911 i c g
 Heriades schwarzi Griswold, 1998 i c g
 Heriades scutellatus Friese, 1922 i c g
 Heriades seyrigi Pauly & Griswold, 2001 i c g
 Heriades shestakovi Popov, 1960 i c g
 Heriades sinuatus Spinola, 1808 i c g
 Heriades spiniscutis (Cameron, 1905) i c g
 Heriades strictifrons Cockerell, 1946 i c g
 Heriades subfrontosus Cockerell, 1939 i c g
 Heriades sulcatiferus Cockerell, 1937 i c g
 Heriades sulcatifrons Cockerell, 1936 i c g
 Heriades sulcatulus Cockerell, 1931 i c g
 Heriades swarzi Griswold, 1998 g
 Heriades tayrona Gonzalez & Griswold, 2011 g
 Heriades tenuis Nurse, 1904 i c g
 Heriades testaceicornis (Cameron, 1908) i c g
 Heriades texanus Michener, 1938 i c g
 Heriades timberlakei Michener, 1938 i c g
 Heriades trigibbiferus Brauns, 1929 i c g
 Heriades trigibliferus Brauns, 1929 g
 Heriades truncorum (Linnaeus, 1758) i c g
 Heriades turcomanicus Popov, 1955 i c g
 Heriades usakensis Cockerell, 1937 i c g
 Heriades ustulata Benoist, 1931 i
 Heriades ustulatus Benoist, 1931 c g
 Heriades variolosus (Cresson, 1872) i c g
 Heriades victoriae Friese, 1922 i c g
 Heriades wellmani Cockerell, 1908 i c g
 Heriades wilmattae Cockerell, 1931 i c g
 Heriades xanthogaster Cockerell, 1932 i c g
 Heriades yunnanensis Wu, 1992 i c g

Data sources: i = ITIS, c = Catalogue of Life, g = GBIF, b = Bugguide.net

References

Heriades